Harald Paulsen (26 August 1895 – 4 August 1954) was a German stage and film actor and director. He appeared in 125 films between 1920 and 1954.

Career
Paulsen first appeared on stage at age sixteen. He then studied under from Leopold Jessner, who was then senior director at Hamburg's Thalia Theater. He made his debut at the Hamburg Stadttheater in 1913. From 1915 until 1917, he served in the German Army during World War I. in 1917–18 he played at the Fronttheater in Mitau. In 1919 he was brought to the Deutsches Theater in Berlin by Max Reinhardt.

From his extensive theatrical work, his role as "Mackie Messer" ("Mack the Knife") in the world premiere of Bertolt Brecht's The Threepenny Opera is particularly noteworthy. This performance took place on 31 August 1928 at the Theater am Schiffbauerdamm. At that time, Paulsen was considered a Brecht admirer. In 1938 Harald Paulsen became director of the Theater am Nollendorfplatz in Berlin, where mainly operettas were performed at that time. He also directed and performed in singing roles. He was forced to resign his position in 1945, following the End of World War II in Europe. Paulsen also appeared as an actor in over twenty silent films. His acting career continued into the sound film era and he appeared in approximately ninety sound films.

Shortly after Adolf Hitler seized power, he became a fervent National Socialist and carried the Flag of Nazi Germany for the student representatives at the May Day rally in Tempelhof. He also participated as an actor in several Nazi propaganda films, such as Ohm Krüger and the pro-euthanasia film Ich klage an, both released in 1941. The Viennese actor Rolf Kutschera reported in his memoirs that Paulsen was notorious among his colleagues as an informant to Nazi authorities.

Death
Harald Paulsen died on 4 August 1954, aged 58, in the general hospital in the Hamburg borough of Altona after suffering from a stroke. He was buried in the Catholic cemetery in Elmshorn. His son Uwe Paulsen (1944–2014) was as a stage and film actor, cabaret artist, and prolific voice actor, who dubbed foreign language film and television into German.

Selected filmography

 The Night of Queen Isabeau (1920)
 The Clan (1920)
 Ilona (1921) as Imre
 The House of Torment (1921)
 The Fateful Day (1921)
 The Men of Sybill (1923)
 The Girl from Hell (1923)
 Man Against Man (1924)
 The Humble Man and the Chanteuse (1925)
 Shadows of the Metropolis (1925) as Boxer Karl
 The Adventures of Sybil Brent (1925) as Commissioner Krenke
 Honeymoon (1928) 
 Alraune (1930) as Frank Braun
 The Tender Relatives (1930) as Mr.Linsemann
 Twice Married (1930) as Wilhelm Meyer
 My Leopold (1931) as Leopold
 Storm in a Water Glass (1931) as Burdach
 One Hour of Happiness (1931) as Tommy
 The Trunks of Mr. O.F. (1931) as Stark the architect
 Unheimliche Geschichten (1932)
 The Importance of Being Earnest (1932)
 The Big Bluff (1933) as Harry Neuhoff
 A Thousand for One Night (1933) as Frank Wellner
 The Daring Swimmer (1934) as Fritz Neubauer
 The Valiant Navigator (1935) as Otto Jebs
 Fresh Wind from Canada (1935) as Jonny
 Artist Love (1935) as Count Hohenstein
 Stradivari (1935)
 Make Me Happy (1935) as Henry Davenport
 She and the Three (1935) as Peter Hüsing
 Ave Maria (1936)
 The Dreamer (1936) as Fritz
 If We All Were Angels (1936) as Enrico Falotti
 The Hour of Temptation (1936)
 Escapade (1936)
 Signal in the Night (1937)
 The Ruler (1937)
 Shadows Over St. Pauli (1938)
 The Marriage Swindler (1938)
 The Secret Lie (1938)
 We Danced Around the World (1939)
 Renate in the Quartet (1939)
 Bismarck (1940) as Benedetti
 The Three Codonas (1940)
 What Does Brigitte Want? (1941)
 Ohm Krüger (1941) as the French foreign minister
 The Thing About Styx (1942) as Dr. Bonnett
 Beloved Darling (1943)
 The Golden Spider (1943)  as Smirnoff / Agent Petersen
 The Court Concert (1948) as Councillor Zunder
 Search for Majora (1949) as Harry
 The Appeal to Conscience (1949) as Korfiz
 My Niece Susanne (1950) as Jean
 The Rabanser Case (1950)
 Professor Nachtfalter (1951)
 Die Tödlichen Träume (1951) as Magier / Rodriguez / Olivier
 Sensation in San Remo (1951)
 The Lady in Black (1951)
 Desires (1952)
 Oh, You Dear Fridolin (1952)
 Three Days of Fear (1952)
 Weekend in Paradise (1952)
 Once on the Rhine (1952)
 Klettermaxe (1952)
 A Very Big Child (1952)
 The Bogeyman (1953)
 The Little Town Will Go to Sleep (1954)
 The Faithful Hussar (1954)
 The Gypsy Baron (1954)
 The Beautiful Miller (1954)

References

External links

Photographs and literature

1895 births
1954 deaths
People from Elmshorn
People from the Province of Schleswig-Holstein
German male stage actors
German male musical theatre actors
German male film actors
German male silent film actors
German theatre directors
Nazi Party members
20th-century German male actors
20th-century German male singers